Piershill is a suburb of north east Edinburgh, Scotland, in the shadow of Arthur's Seat.
It is mainly residential, with local amenities including a large Morrisons supermarket and filling station, bank, public library, optician, pharmacy, several takeaway restaurants and specialist retailers along with public houses.

Piershill existed as a distinct area in Restalrig before 1500 and is recorded in 1588 as Peirieshill. The name may derive from the French name Pierre or from the Scots persche relating to other willow names in the area.

Piershill is adjoined by Mountcastle and Willowbrae to the south, Jock's Lodge and Meadowbank just to the west, Portobello to the east and Restalrig and Craigentinny to the north.

Buildings

The Piershill Square East/West/Portobello Road tenements, containing 342 dwellings, were built 1937-8 by the Edinburgh Corporation Council. They were designed by Ebenezer James MacRae (1881–1951), Edinburgh's City Architect and members of his architectural team.  MacRae was City Architect for twenty years and his infill developments and reinterpretation of Scots vernacular architecture are an important part of Edinburgh's inter-war heritage.  These tenements reflect MacRae's tours of Europe in their planning and layout.  Many of the original multi-pane sash windows have been replaced with uPVC (without listed building consent) as the flats were sold under the right to buy. They were built on the site of Piershill Barracks, and re-used the stone facings from the old buildings. They are a reinterpretation of the traditional tenement, a housing type more usually associated with the Nineteenth century.

Transport
The East Coast Main Line between Edinburgh and London lies to the immediate north of the estate. Smokey Brae lies immediately west of Piershill, being the local name for the route to Restalrig which travels beneath the railway line. Immediately before the first bridge on the high wall to the right can be seen the remains of the original back gate to Piershill Barracks, now walled up but still with the legend BACK GATE visible on the wall; there is also a bricked up doorway to the left of the back gate.

As well as the East Coast Main Line railway there is also a busy crossroads, the main A1 road trunk route between Edinburgh and London and the A1140 to Portobello. The area is well served by Lothian Buses.

Piershill Cemetery

The cemetery appears unexceptional but includes a number of curious military memorials, and 63 Commonwealth war graves. To the east there is a large section reserved for Jewish burials and to the north-west is Scotland's first and Edinburgh's only Pet Cemetery. Notable monuments include:

Multiple members of the Codona family, fairground entertainers
Memorial to David Norman Duncan, engineer lost in the disastrous test run on the submarine Thetis on 1  June 1939
Samuel Evans (VC) (d.1901)
Sigmund Neuberger, a famous illusionist known as The Great Lafayette, along with his dog Beauty
George Wilson, a recipient of the Victoria Cross
Several monuments to members of the Order of Free Gardeners
Monument to ex-soldiers dying in the service of the Earl Haig Fund
Monument to the Jewish soldiers of Edinburgh who lost their lives in the two world wars
Monument to soldiers of the Highland Light Infantry
Monument to soldiers of the Black Watch
Monument to soldiers of the Royal Scots Greys
Two Czechoslovakian service personnel of World War II. Note these lie in the central Jewish section

Community Flat
Until 2016 Piershill Square West had a "Community Flat", run by the National Health Service (NHS). Staffed full-time by a coordinator, with additional staff from various agencies supporting the project on a weekly basis, the Community Flat was run in partnership between the City of Edinburgh Council and NHS Lothian. It offered services including a residents' group; a parent and toddler group; stop smoking services; state benefits advice; social groups; links to Working Towards Health; and links to Action for Jobs with Jobcentre Plus. The flat was predominantly for use by residents of the two squares in Piershill, Portobello Road and the top of Restalrig Road South, but from March 2007 was part of the greater Regeneration Outcome Agreement area of Restalrig, Lochend and Craigentinny. It has now been returned to the Council by the NHS and is in ordinary housing use.

See also
Edinburgh, Leith and Newhaven Railway
Edinburgh Suburban and Southside Junction Railway

Notes

External links
Bartholomew's Chronological map of Edinburgh (1919)

Areas of Edinburgh